Christoph Spatzenegger (born 3 April 1979) is an Austrian footballer who currently plays for the TSV Neumarkt.

External links
 
 
 soccerpunter.com profile 
 salzburg.com profile 
 salzburg12.at profile 
 bundesliga.at profile 
 laskonline.at profile 

1979 births
Living people
Austrian footballers
Austrian Football Bundesliga players
SV Grödig players
FC Braunau players
FC Red Bull Salzburg players
ASVÖ FC Puch players
LASK players
SV Seekirchen players
TSV Neumarkt players
Association football defenders